Al-Jaṣṣās (305 AH/917 AD - 370 AH/981 AD; full name Abū Bakr Aḥmad ibn ʿAlī al-Rāzī al-Jaṣṣāṣ)  was a Hanafite scholar, mostly known as the commentator of Al-Ḫaṣṣāf's work on Qādī (jurisprudence).
According to Tillier (2009:281), the original work and its commentary can now "hardly be separated: al-Khaṣṣāf's original text is included in al-Jaṣṣāṣ's commentary". 
Al-Jaṣṣās is also the author of a work on tafsir, Aḥkām al-Qur'ān.

Editions 
 Al-Khaṣṣāf, Adab al-qāḍī, ed. Farḥāt Ziyāda (Cairo: American University in Cairo Press, 1978) 
 Abubakar Ahmad Ibn ‘Amr al-Khassaf, Kitab Ahkam al-Awqaf (Cairo: Diwan ‘Umum al-Awqaf al-Misriyyah, 1904) 
Aḥkām al-Qur’ān, Beirut, Libanon: Dār al-Iḥyā’ al-Turāth, 1984
Aḥkām al-qurʾān. Beirut: Dār al-Kutub al-ʿIlmīya, 1994

References 

 Otto Spies, al-Djaṣṣāṣ, EI2, p. 486
 Peter C. Hennigan: “al-Khaṣṣāf (d. 261/874)”, in: Oussama Arabi, David Stephan Powers, Susan Ann Spectorsky: Islamic Legal Thought. A Compendium of Muslim Jurists Brill Academic Pub, 2013,   
 Mathieu Tillier: Women before the qāḍī under the Abbasids, Islamic Law and Society, Vol. 16 (2009)
 Peter C Hennigan: The birth of a legal institution : the formation of the waqf in third-century A.H. Ḥanafī legal discourse.  2003
 Ādāb al-Qāḍī: Islamic legal and judicial system. Aḥmad ibn ʻUmar Khaṣṣāf; ʻUmar ibn ʻAbd al-ʻAzīz Ṣadr al-Shahīd; Munir Ahmad Mughal

Hanafis
10th-century deaths
10th-century jurists
Mu'tazilites